Pedrão is a hypocorism of the name Pedro, meaning "Big Pedro" in Portuguese.

Notable people named Pedrão include:

 Pedrão (footballer, born 1978), full name Christiano Florêncio da Silva, Brazilian footballer
 Pedrão (footballer, born 1986), full name Pedro Luiz Barone, Brazilian football defender
 Pedrão (footballer, born 1992), full name Pedro Henrique Dias de Amorim, Brazilian football centre-back
 Pedrão (footballer, born 1997), full name Pedro Henrique de Oliveira Correia, Brazilian footballer

See also
 Pedro (disambiguation)
 Pedrinho